Major-General Charles Edward Anson Firth,  (1902 – 13 October 1991) was a British Army officer.

Early life
He was the son of Major Edward William Anson Firth of the 69th Punjabis, who died in 1906. He was educated at Wellington College and the Royal Military College, Sandhurst.

Military career
Firth was commissioned into the Gloucestershire Regiment on 1 February 1923 and attended the Staff College, Camberley from 1936 to 1937.

After being promoted to major on 1 February 1940, he became commanding officer of the 1st Battalion Royal Sussex Regiment, in the Middle East in 1942 during the Second World War. He also served as commander of the 167th (1st London) Brigade in North Africa from June 1943, as commander of 21st Army Tank Brigade in North Africa and in Italy from February 1944 and as commander of 2nd Infantry Brigade from May 1944.

After the war he became deputy director of personal services at the War Office in February 1946, commander of the Berlin Infantry Brigade in February 1949 and general officer commanding East Anglian District in April 1950. He went on to be general officer commanding, Salisbury Plain District in May 1951 and director of personal services at the War Office in August 1953 before retiring in September 1956.

He served as honorary colonel of the Gloucestershire Regiment from 1954 to 1964.

References

External links
Generals of World War II

1902 births
1991 deaths
British Army major generals
Companions of the Order of the Bath
Commanders of the Order of the British Empire
Companions of the Distinguished Service Order
Gloucestershire Regiment officers
British Army brigadiers of World War II
People educated at Wellington College, Berkshire
Graduates of the Royal Military College, Sandhurst
Graduates of the Staff College, Camberley